Non-Stop is the second album by the Brooklyn, New York band B. T. Express. Released in July 1975, the album reached number one on the Billboard R&B albums chart in the US.

Track listing
"Peace Pipe" - (Mark Barkan, Sam Taylor)  6:04
"Give It What You Got" - (Solomon Roberts)  4:19
"Discotizer" - (Hiram Bullock, Larry Alexander) 3:28
"Still Good - Still Like It" - (Sam Taylor) 4:28
"Close To You" - (Burt Bacharach - Hal David)  5:37
"You Got It - I Want It" - (Billy Barnes, Bob Levine, Don Thomas, Trade Martin)  5:25
"Devil's Workshop" - (Barbara Risbrook, William Risbrook)  4:00
"Happiness" - (Carlos Ward)  3:38
"Whatcha Think About That?" - (Richard Thompson)  4:05

Personnel
Richard Thompson - guitar, vocals
Mark Radice - synthesizer (Moog and string ensemble)
Louis Risbrook - vocals, bass, organ
Terrell Wood - drums
Dennis Rowe - congas, timbales
Sam Taylor - rhythm guitar
Bill Risbrook, Carlos Ward - saxophone, flute
Irving Spice - strings
Barbara Joyce - vocals

Charts

Singles

See also
List of Billboard number-one R&B albums of 1975

References

External links
 B.T. Express-Non Stop at Discogs

1975 albums
B. T. Express albums